Hum, also referred to as Hum Brdo (lit. "Hum Hill"), is a small mountain located north of Sarajevo, Bosnia and Herzegovina. At its top is the Hum Tower. In wider terms, Hum hill is considered as part of Sarajevo's Ozren.

Most of the area has been designated as a park and recreational zone called Park Šuma Hum, and a number of sports and recreational facilities are planned for the near future. The very top of Hum offers views of Sarajevo, as well as the mountains Trebević, Igman and Bjelašnica.

References

Sarajevo Canton
Mountains of Bosnia and Herzegovina